The 2014–15 UNC Wilmington Seahawks women's basketball team represents the University of North Carolina Wilmington during the 2014–15 NCAA Division I women's basketball season. The Seahawks, led by third year head coach Adell Harris, play their home games at the Trask Coliseum and were members of the Colonial Athletic Association. They finished the season 14–16, 10–8 in CAA play to finish in fifth place. They lost in the quarterfinals of the CAA women's tournament to Elon.

Roster

Schedule

|-
!colspan=9 style="background:#006666; color:#FFFF66;"| Exhibition

|-
!colspan=9 style="background:#006666; color:#FFFF66;"| Regular season

|-
!colspan=9 style="background:#006666; color:#FFFF66;"| 2015 CAA Tournament

See also
 2014–15 UNC Wilmington Seahawks men's basketball team

References

UNC Wilmington Seahawks women's basketball seasons
Unc Wilmington